Ancey is a commune in the Côte-d'Or department in the Bourgogne-Franche-Comté region of eastern France.

The inhabitants of the commune are known as Anceyéens or Anceyéennes

Geography
Ancey is located some 25 km west of Dijon and 2 km north of Sainte-Marie-sur-Ouche. It can be accessed by the D104C road from Malain in the west passing south of the village eastwards to Lantenay. The D104L also comes from Fleurey-sur-Ouche in the south-east. The village is located north of the D104C and can be accessed by several country roads. The railway line from Dijon passes through the commune from east to west south of the village but the nearest station is just outside the commune to the west. Most of the commune north of the village is heavily forested however south of the village is mostly farmland.

Although the Canal de Bourgogne passes to the south of the commune there are no identifiable waterways in the commune.

Neighbouring communes and villages

History

Heraldry

Administration

List of Successive Mayors

Demography
In 2017 the commune had 442 inhabitants.

Culture and heritage

Civil heritage
The commune has many buildings and structures that are registered as historical monuments:

A Farmhouse (1) (1623)
A Farmhouse (2) (1760)
A Farmhouse (3) (1815)
A Farmhouse (4) (18th century)
A Farmhouse (5) (1790)
A House (1) (1769)
A House (2) (1781)
A House (3) (18th century)
A House (4) (18th century)
A House (5) (19th century)
A House (6) (19th century)
A House (7) (18th century)
A House (8) (19th century)
A House (9) (1846)
A House at Rue d'Amont (19th century)
A House (10) (18th century)
A House (11) (19th century)
A House (12) (18th century)
A House at Chemin de Panges (1824)
Houses and Farms (17th-19th centuries)

Religious heritage
The commune has three religious sites that are registered as historical monuments:
A Wayside Cross at Route de Mâlain (1810)
A Monumental Cross (19th century)
The Parish Church of the Nativity (1545). The Church contains many items that are registered as historical objects:
A Reliquary of Sainte-Brigide (16th century)
A Commemorative Plaque (1787)
A set of 2 Crosses of Consecration (16th century)
A Fresco: Adoration of the Magi (16th century)
Pews, Wall Lamp, a bench, and a door (1791)
A Processional Staff: Virgin and child (18th century)
A Processional Staff: Saint Vincent (19th century)
A Processional Cross (18th century)
A Processional Staff: Sainte Brigide (17th century)
2 Paintings: The Adoration of the Shepherds and the Adoration of the Magi (1654)
A Statue: Saint évêque (17th century)
A Statue: Virgin and child (18th century)
A Confessional (19th century)
A Pulpit (18th century)
The Furniture in the Church
A Mural: Virgin of the Assumption (19th century)
An Altar, Retable, and Tabernacle (18th century)

See also
Communes of the Côte-d'Or department

References

External links
Ancey on the old National Geographic Institute website 
Ancey on Géoportail, National Geographic Institute (IGN) website 
Ancey on the 1750 Cassini Map

Communes of Côte-d'Or